Ball Stream is a meltwater stream  west of Marble Point on the coast of Victoria Land. It issues from the front of Wilson Piedmont Glacier and flows northeast to Surko Stream just west of where the latter enters Arnold Cove. The stream was studied by Robert L. Nichols, a geologist for Metcalf and Eddy, Engineers, Boston, MA, who made engineering studies here under contract to the U.S. Navy in the 1957–58 season, and was named by Nichols for Donald G. Ball, a soil physicist with Metcalf and Eddy.

References 

Rivers of Victoria Land
Scott Coast